Calaveras Unified School District is a public school district based in Calaveras County, California.

References

External links
 

School districts in Calaveras County, California